TKM may refer to:

 TKM (karting)
 TKM (Polish term)
 TKM Institute of Technology
 Thangal Kunju Musaliar College of Engineering
 Tshibumba Kanda-Matulu, a Congolese artist
 Toyota Kirloskar Motor, a car maker
 Tonne-kilometre, a unit of transportation measurement
 Turkmenistan, by its IOC and ISO 3166-1 alpha-3 code